This is a list of notable female boxers. For a list of notable male boxers, see List of male boxers.

A

B

C

D

E

F

G

H

J

K

L

M

N

O

P

R

S

T

U

V

W

Y

Z

See also
List of current female world boxing champions
List of current women boxing rankings
List of male boxers

 Female
Incomplete sports lists
Female